Davi Sara (also Romanized as Da‘vī Sarā; also known as Da‘vá Sarā) is a village in Reza Mahalleh Rural District, in the Central District of Rudsar County, Gilan Province, Iran. At the 2006 census, its population was 204, in 63 families.

References 

Populated places in Rudsar County